Ticklebelly Tales - with the subtitle of and other stories from the people of the Hydro by Heather Felton, was a book published in 2008 about the people who had worked for the Hydro Electric Commission of Tasmania from 1910 to 2006.

History

The comprehensive history included institutional details as well as personal anecdotes.  A later edition was published in 2013.

Earlier histories of the HEC exist - Garvies' A Million Horses of 1962 and Roger Luptons' Lifeblood of 2000, however Fenton's style and the production of the Ticklebelly Tales volume includes details of over many interviews and extensive photographic material.

Notes

Hydro-Tasmania
History of Tasmania
Books about Tasmania
2008 non-fiction books